Disney's Beauty and the Beast is a platform game for the Super Nintendo Entertainment System. Based on the 1991 Disney film of the same name, it was developed by Probe Entertainment and published by Hudson Soft in North America on July 1, 1994 and Europe on February 23, 1995, respectively. The game was published by Virgin Interactive in Japan on July 8, 1994. The entire game is played through the perspective of the Beast. As the Beast, the player must get Belle to fall in love so that the curse cast upon him and his castle will be broken, she will marry him and become a princess. The final boss of the game is Gaston, a hunter who will try to steal Belle from the Beast.

Reception
On release, Famitsu reported that the game had received a 6 out of 10 in their Reader Cross Review.

References

1994 video games
Beauty and the Beast (franchise) video games
Hudson Soft games
Single-player video games
Super Nintendo Entertainment System games
Video games based on adaptations
Video games based on films
Video games developed in the United Kingdom
Video games set in castles
Video games set in France